A coup d'état (often referred to as a coup) is the sudden overthrow of a government through unconstitutional means.

Coup d'état may also refer to:

Films
Coup d'Etat (1973 film), a 1973 Japanese film directed by Yoshishige Yoshida
Coup d'Etat, the working title for film Dear Dictator (2018)
Coup d'Etat, an Australian television documentary about the four days of nonviolent military revolt that ousted President Ferdinand Marcos

Music
 Coup D'etat (band), a New Zealand rock band from the early 1980s and their self-titled sole album
Coup d'etat (Plasmatics album), a 1982 album by Plasmatics
 Coup d'etat (Muslimgauze album), a 1987 album by Muslimgauze
Coup d'Etat (G-Dragon album), a 2013 album by G-Dragon
"Coup d'Etat", a song by Level 42 on the album World Machine
"Coup d'etat", a song by Refused on the album Songs to Fan the Flames of Discontent
"Coup d'État", a song by Circle Jerks on the album Golden Shower of Hits
"Coup d'Etat", a song by Henry Jackman on the album X-men: First Class

Other uses
Coup d'etat (comics), a 2004 crossover event published by Wildstorm Comics
"Coup D'etat" (Stargate Atlantis), an episode of the science fiction television series Stargate: Atlantis
Coup d'État: A Practical Handbook, a 1969 book by Edward Luttwak that examines aspects of a coup and how to go about initiating one

See also
 Coup (disambiguation)